Celia Woodsmith (born in 1985 in Tryon, North Carolina) is a New England-based bluegrass, blues and folk musician.

Profile
Woodsmith attended the University of Vermont from 2003 to 2007, where, with Avi Salloway, she began performing as the folk duo Avi & Celia. From 2008-2010 she was part of the Boston-based "washboard rock n' roll" group Hey Mama.

From 2011 onwards, Woodsmith, was the lead singer, rhythm guitar player and songwriter for Della Mae. In 2013, Della Mae won the International Bluegrass Music Association's Emerging Artist of the Year award in 2013 and was nominated for a best bluegrass album at the 56th Grammy Awards. Della Mae has worked with the US Department of State as cultural diplomats and, as such, in 2012 travelled to Pakistan, Kazakhstan, Kyrgyzstan, Tajikistan, Turkmenistan and Uzbekistan.

Woodsmith was a founding member of the Boston rock band Say Darling, co-founded with Chris Hersch the former guitar player for Girls, Guns and Glory in 2016.

She plays an Aged Tone OM Bourgeois guitar  made in Maine by Dana Bourgeois.

Discography

Avi & Celia
Off The Floor (2007)
Let It Rise (2008)

Hey Mama
Hey Mama (2009)
Dubl Handi Suite (2010)

Della Mae
I Built This Heart (2011)
This World Oft Can Be (Rounder Records, 2013)
Della Mae (Rounder Records, 2015)
Butcher Shoppe EP (Rounder Records, 2018)
Headlight(Rounder Records, 2020)
Family Reunion (Self Release, 2021)

Say Darling
Say Darling (2017)
Before & After (2021)

As solo artist
 Cast Iron Shoes (2018)
 Like Wine b/w Wounded Love + No Angel (single) (2018)

References

External links 
 www.celiawoodsmith.com
 www.dellamae.com
 www.saydarling.com

1985 births
Living people
American bluegrass guitarists
American women country singers
American country singer-songwriters
American women songwriters
People from Tryon, North Carolina
21st-century American women singers
Country musicians from North Carolina
21st-century American women guitarists
21st-century American guitarists
21st-century American singers
Singer-songwriters from North Carolina